Benjamin Brown (September 23, 1756 – September 17, 1831) was a physician and an American politician who served in the United States Congress as a United States Representative from Massachusetts (Maine was a part of Massachusetts until 1820).

Early life
Born in Swansea in the Province of Massachusetts Bay, Brown studied medicine and began his medical practice in Waldoboro, Lincoln County, District of Maine.

Career
Brown served as a surgeon aboard the American frigate "Boston" in 1778 when John Adams traveled on the "Boston" while American commissioner to France. Along with Commander Tucker, he was captured in 1781 on the American warship Thorne; imprisoned on Prince Edward Island, and escaped in an open boat.

A member of the Massachusetts state house of representatives, Brown served as a state representative in 1809, 1811, 1812 and in 1819. He was elected as a Federalist to the Fourteenth Congress, and served as a United States Representative for the sixteenth district for the state of Massachusetts from March 4, 1815 to March 3, 1817. After leaving office, he resumed the practice of medicine until his death.

Family life
Brown married Susan Wells. His son John G. Brown married Bertha Smouse and also practiced medicine in Waldoboro and built the house on the corner of Church (now School) and Main street now known as Stahls Tavern.

Death
Brown died on September 17, 1831 (age 74 years 359 days) in Waldoboro, Maine. He is interred at Waldoboro Cemetery in Waldoboro.

References

External links

 
 govtrack.us

1756 births
1831 deaths
People from Swansea, Massachusetts
People from Waldoboro, Maine
People of colonial Massachusetts
18th-century American physicians
Members of the Massachusetts House of Representatives
Federalist Party members of the United States House of Representatives from Massachusetts
Members of the United States House of Representatives from the District of Maine